Antoine Mendy (born August 16, 1983) is a French-born Senegalese basketball player who plays for the French Pro B league club Orléans Loiret Basket.

He represented Senegal's national basketball team at the 2009 African Basketball Championship.

References

1983 births
Living people
French men's basketball players
French sportspeople of Senegalese descent
Citizens of Senegal through descent
JDA Dijon Basket players
Orléans Loiret Basket players
Senegalese men's basketball players
Basketball players from Paris
Shooting guards